David Simko (born November 26, 1954 in Clarkston, Michigan) is a former NASCAR Winston Cup Series driver who participated in ten races over the course of six seasons.

His average starting position was 35th and his average finishing position was 32nd. Total career earnings for this driver was $17,220 ($ when adjusted for inflation). He is the father of current ARCA Racing Series driver Michael Simko.

References

1954 births
NASCAR drivers
People from Clarkston, Michigan
Living people
Racing drivers from Michigan